John Crofts was a politician.

John Crofts may also refer to:

John Crofts (died 1628), MP for Thetford (UK Parliament constituency)
John Crofts (priest), Dean of Norwich

See also
John Croft (disambiguation)